Interface apparency is a term used in technology to describe the degree to which a user interface enables a user to understand hidden contingencies, such as drop down menus or context menus which only appear after an action, within a computer or computerised system; or, how easy it is for a person coming upon an interface such as a website, a computer program, or a kiosk, to understand the sequence of steps required to perform a complex action using that interface.

Spatial visualization ability (SVA) helps to predict which users will be hampered by low levels of apparency in an interface; the higher a person's SVA, the less trouble they will have with an interface with hidden contingencies.

Introduction

Diane Lindwarm Alonso, a doctor of philosophy at the University of Maryland, and Kent Norman, associate professor of psychology at the University of Maryland, (1998) defined interface apparency as visually showing hidden relationships in an interface. In situations where certain options are unavailable or greyed-out, it may be unclear what circumstances would allow those options to be available. For instance, if one is using a text editor, the “Delete” option may be unavailable because no text is selected, or if no text is on the clipboard, “Paste” may be greyed-out.

References

User interfaces